Niphona appendiculata is a species of beetle in the family Cerambycidae. It was described by Carl Eduard Adolph Gerstaecker in 1871.

References

appendiculata
Beetles described in 1871